Brusk Sport Club is an Iraqi football team based in Erbil, that plays in Iraq Division Two and Kurdistan Premier League.

Managerial history
  Delshad Maarouf 
  Nazar Akram

Famous players
Ali Hussein Shihab (1995–2000)

Honours

Domestic
Kurdistan Premier League
Winners (2): 2007–08, 2008–09

See also 
 2001–02 Iraq FA Cup
 2002–03 Iraq FA Cup

References

External links
 Brusk SC on Goalzz.com
 Iraq Clubs- Foundation Dates

1998 establishments in Iraq
Association football clubs established in 1998
Football clubs in Erbil